Unlimited Psychic Squad, known in Japan as  is a Japanese anime series produced by Manglobe. It is a spin-off to the original Zettai Karen Children manga series, created by Takashi Shiina. A manga adaptation by Rokurou Ogaki was serialized in Shogakukan's Shōnen Sunday S from March 2013 to July 2015, with its chapters collected into six tankōbon volumes.

Media

Anime

In September 2012, a new anime project based on Zettai Karen Children was announced in the 41st issue of Weekly Shōnen Sunday. It was later revealed that it would be an original spin-off series focused on main antagonist Kyōsuke Hyōbu and his organization known as P.A.N.D.R.A.. Unlimited Psychic Squad was produced by Manglobe and ran for 12 episodes on TV Tokyo and other stations from January 7 to March 25, 2013. New additions to the cast include Nao Tōyama as Yūgiri and Junichi Suwabe as Andy Hinomiya while almost all characters from the first TV Series are voiced by the same actors from then. The series, while similar in setting and characters, is darker and more serious in plot and tone than the original Zettai Karen Children series. The opening song is "LAST RESOLUTION" by Emblem of THE UNLIMITED and has two versions, one in English and the other in Japanese. It also has eight ending songs: "OUTLAWS" by eyelis, "BRIGHTEST LIGHT" by Yuichi Nakamura and Kishō Taniyama, "DARKNESS NIGHT" (another version of "BRIGHTEST LIGHT) by Kōji Yusa & Junichi Suwabe, "BRAND NEW EDEN" by Kōji Yusa, "ADVENT" by Kōji Yusa, another arrangement of "DARKNESS NIGHT", titled "DARKNESS NIGHT (Hyōbu Arrange.)", performed by Kōji Yusa and Junichi Suwabe, "Sora no Hate (空の涯て;End of the Sky)" by eyelis, and a secondary arrangement of "DARKNESS NIGHT" called "DARKNESS NIGHT (Hinomiya Arrange.)" performed by Kōji Yusa and Junichi Suwabe. There is an insert song in the final episode called "Mirai Monogatari (未来物語;Future Story)" by Nao Tōyama.

The series has been streamed by Crunchyroll. In December 2014, Sentai Filmworks announced that they have licensed the series. It was released on DVD and Blu-ray in Japanese with English subtitles on April 21, 2015.

Manga
A manga adaptation, by Rokurou Ogaki, ran in Shogakukan's Shōnen Sunday S from March 25, 2013, to May 25, 2015. An additional story, titled , was published in Shōnen Sunday S, from June 25 and July 25, 2015. Shogakukan collected its chapters in six tankōbon volumes, released from to August 16, 2013, to September 18, 2015.

Volume list

See also
 Akudama Drive, an anime series whose manga adaptation is written and illustrated by Rokurou Ogaki
 Crazy Food Truck, a manga series written and illustrated by Rokurou Ogaki

References

External links
 

2013 anime television series debuts
Action anime and manga
Manglobe
Sentai Filmworks
Shogakukan manga
Shōnen manga
Supernatural anime and manga
TV Tokyo original programming